Mariame Kaba is an American activist, grassroots organizer, and educator who advocates for the abolition of the prison industrial complex, including all police. She is the author of We Do This 'Til We Free Us (2021). The Mariame Kaba Papers are held by the Chicago Public Library Special Collections.

Early life and education 
Mariame Kaba was born in New York City to immigrant parents. Her mother immigrated from the Ivory Coast; her father was involved in the independence struggle in Guinea.

Mariame grew up on the Lower East Side of Manhattan and attended Lycée Français. As a child, she viewed the world through a black nationalist framework and looked for ways to help others. Kaba received a B.A. in Sociology from McGill University in 1992. In 1995 she moved to Chicago to study sociology at Northwestern University. She completed her master's degree in Library and Information Science at Pratt Institute.

Career 
In Chicago, she founded the Chicago Freedom School, the Rogers Park Young Women's Action Team (YWAT), Chicago Taskforce on Violence against Girls and Young Women, Chicago Alliance to Free Marissa Alexander, and We Charge Genocide (WCG). In 2009, Kaba founded the organization Project NIA, which advocates to end youth incarceration.

Kaba views prison abolition as the total dismantling of prison and policing while building up community services and opposes the reform of policing. Her work has created the framework for current abolitionist organizations including Black Youth Project 100, Black Lives Matter Chicago, and Assata's Daughters.

Writing 
Kaba maintained a blog, "US Prison Culture," beginning in 2010. She has been active on Twitter under the account @prisonculture.

In 2012, she wrote Resisting Police Violence in Harlem, a historical pamphlet detailing the policing and violence in Harlem.

In March 2018, she wrote Lifting As They Climbed: Mapping A History Of Black Women On Chicago’s South Side with Essence McDowell. Started in 2012, the book is written as a guidebook that maps the history of the influential Black women who contributed to the development of Chicago during the 19th and 20th centuries.

In 2021, she published We Do This 'Til We Free Us with Haymarket Books. It debuted at number nine on The New York Times bestseller list for non-fiction paperbacks. In a review for the Chicago Reader, Ariel Parrella-Aureli described it as “a collection of talks, interviews, and past work that can serve as an initial primer on the PIC [prison-industrial complex] abolition and community building rooted in transformative justice.” Kaba was reluctant to write the book, but the mass protests in the summer of 2020 persuaded her, in the interests of lending her tools for collective action to newly activated organizers.

Awards 
 2010 7th District Community Award from State Senator Heather Steans
 2012 Courage Tour Award from A Long Walk Home
 2013 Ed Marciniak Bright Star Award from the Bright Promises Foundation
 2014 Impact Award from the Chicago Foundation for Women
 2014 Women Who Dared Award from Chicago NOW
 2014 Partner in Justice Award from Lawndale Christian Legal Center
 2015 Women to Celebrate Award
 2016 AERA Ella Baker/Septima Clark Human Rights Award
 2016-2017 Soros Justice Fellow.
 2017 Ron Sable Award for Activism
 2017 Peace Award by War Resisters League
 2022 Honorary Doctorate of Humane Letters awarded by Chicago Theological Seminary

Anti-violence projects 
 A World Without Prisons Art Exhibit curated by Project NIA and Free Write Jail Arts & Literacy Program.
 Restorative Posters Project
 Co-curated No Selves to Defend.
 Co-curated Blood at the Root – Unearthing the Stories of State Violence Against Black Women and Girls.
 Co-curated Making Niggers: Demonizing and Distorting Blackness
 Co-curated Black/Inside. Black/Inside: A History of Captivity & Confinement in the U.S. Art Exhibit on display at African American Cultural Center Gallery

Publications 
 
 
 
 
 
 
 
 "To Live and Die in "Chiraq."" The End of Chiraq: A Literary Mixtape. Eds Javon Johnson and Kevin Coval. Northwestern University Press.
 "Bresha Meadows Returns Home After Collective Organizing Efforts." Teen Vogue.
 "For Mother's Day, Activists Are Bailing Black Mamas out of Jail." Broadly.
 Foreword, As Black As Resistance: Finding the Conditions for Liberation, by Zoé Samudzi and William C. Anderson. AK Press. 2018.
 Introduction, Trying To Make the Personal Political, with the Women's Action Alliance, Lori Sharpe, Jane Ginsburg and Gail Gordon, and Jacqui Shine. Half-Letter Press. 2017.

References

Further reading

External links 

 
 Project Nia
 Interrupting Criminalization
 Mariame Kaba Papers at the Chicago Public Library

Living people
Year of birth missing (living people)
Organization founders
Lycée Français de New York alumni
Northwestern University alumni
Police abolitionists
Prison abolitionists